Git is a distributed version control system.

Git, Gits or GIT may also refer to:

Language
 Git (pronoun), a pronoun in Old English
 Git (slang), British slang for a contemptible person
 Gitxsan language

Entertainment
 Git!, a 1965 American drama film
 Git Gay (1921–2007), Swedish actress and singer
 Feathers in the Wind, a 2005 South Korean film
 Ghost in the Shell, a Japanese media franchise

Music
 Git (album), by Skeletons & The Girl-Faced Boys
 G.I.T.: Get It Together, a 1973 album by The Jackson 5
 The Gits, a post punk band
 "Git" (song), by Candan Erçetin
 G.I.T., an Argentine rock band

Mathematics, science and technology
 Gastrointestinal tract
 Geographic information technology
 Geometric invariant theory
 Geoscientist In Training, a professional designation

Places
 Git, Iran, a village

Other uses 
 Gebze Institute of Technology, in Turkey
 Georgia Institute of Technology, a public research university in Atlanta, Georgia, United States
 Graphic Imaging Technology, an American digital archiving company
 GROWTH-India Telescope, India's first fully robotic research telescope
 Guitar Institute of Technology, former name of the Musicians Institute

See also
 G.I.T. on Broadway, a 1969 television special